Greatest Hits is an American television program on the ABC network that aired from June 30 to August 4, 2016, featuring famous musical performers from the 1980s, 1990s and 2000s. The show was hosted by Arsenio Hall and Kelsea Ballerini.

Episodes
All songs are listed in order of the episodes.

References

2010s American music television series
2016 American television series debuts
2016 American television series endings
American Broadcasting Company original programming